The 2003 Conference USA men's basketball tournament was held March 12–15 at Freedom Hall in Louisville, Kentucky.

Louisville defeated upstart  in the championship game, 83–78, to clinch their first Conference USA men's tournament championship.

The Cardinals, in turn, received an automatic bid to the 2003 NCAA tournament. They were joined in the tournament by fellow C-USA members Cincinnati, Marquette, and Memphis, all of whom earned at-large bids.

Format
There were no changes to the tournament format from the previous year. The top four teams were given byes into the quarterfinal round while the next eight teams were placed into the first round. The two teams with the worst conference records were not invited to the tournament. All remaining tournament seeds were determined by regular season conference records.

Bracket

References

Conference USA men's basketball tournament
Tournament
Conference USA men's basketball tournament
Conference USA men's basketball tournament
Basketball competitions in Louisville, Kentucky